Zeleneč is a village and municipality of Trnava District in the Trnava region of Slovakia. Located about 8 km from Trnava it is a relatively big village, similar to other villages in Western Slovakia. Zeleneč inhabitants work mostly in neighboring production plants or sustain themselves with agriculture.

References

External links

http://en.e-obce.sk/obec/zelenec/zelenec.html
https://web.archive.org/web/20071116010355/http://www.statistics.sk/mosmis/eng/run.html
Official page

Villages and municipalities in Trnava District